The Real Housewives of Cheshire is a British reality television series that premiered on 12 January 2015 on ITVBe. It chronicles the lives of 8 women —  Lauren Simon, Seema Malhotra, Rachel Lugo, Hanna Kinsella, Nicole Sealey, Lystra Adams Sheena Lynch and Natasha Hamilton.— in  Cheshire as they socialize, work on their careers and spend time with their families.

As of 19 December  2022, 164 episodes of The Real Housewives of Cheshire have aired over fifteen series.

Series overview

Episodes

Series 1 (2015)

Tanya Bardsley, Leanne Brown, Magali Gorré, Ampika Pickston, Lauren Simon, and Dawn Ward are introduced as series regulars.

Series 2 (2015)

Series 3 (2016)
Gorré departed as a series regular. Missé Beqiri, Stacey Forsey, and Seema Malhotra joined the cast.

Series 4 (2016)

Series 5 (2017)
Beqiri departed as a series regular. Ester Dohnalová joined the cast.

Series 6 (2017)
Pickston departed as a series regular. Rachel Lugo and Nermina Pieters-Mekic joined the cast.

Series 7 (2018)
Brown departed as a series regular.

Series 8 (2018)
Forsey and Pieters-Mekic departed as series regulars. Hanna Kinsella and Perla Navia joined the cast.

Series 9 (2019)
Simon departed as a series regular. This was the last season to air at its original 10pm time slot.

Series 10 (2019)
Leilani Dowding joined the cast. This was the first season to air at its new time slot at 9pm.

Series 11 (2020)
This season was shortened to eight episodes as a result of the COVID-19 pandemic.

Navia and Dowding departed as series regulars. Simon rejoined the cast as a series regular. Nicole Sealey joined the cast.

Series 12 (2020)
Dohnalová departed as a series regular after episode 2. Lystra Adams joined the cast.

Series 13 (2021)
Ward departed as a series regular. Deborah Davies joined the cast.

Series 14 (2021)
Sheena Lynch joined the cast.

Specials (2022) Real Housewives And The Menopause

Series 15 (2022)
Bardsley and Davies departed as series regulars. Katie Alex joined the cast.

Christmas specials (2022)  
The Christmas specials were titled "Christmas Cruising". All housewives from the previous series appeared in the specials, former housewives Tanya Bardsley and Ester Dee made a short return for the specials.

Series 16 (2023)

Notes

References

External links
 
 
 The Real Housewives of Cheshire at TV Guide

The Real Housewives of Cheshire
Lists of British reality television series episodes